Gianism Best Ofs consists of four best of albums released by Nightmare. These two albums were also released as a limited edition double album. The album Gianism ~Nightmare no Kuse ni Namaikidazo~, consists of their best of songs after they went major.

Track listing

Chart positions

References

Nightmare (Japanese band) albums
2006 compilation albums